Mandege is an administrative ward in Gairo District in the Morogoro Region of  Tanzania, East Africa. As of 2002, the population of the ward was 7,247. The Mandege Forest Station, headquarters for the Mamiwa Forest Reserve, is located there.

The ward consists of two rural agglomerates,  Ikwamba, and Njungwa. Each of these has denominated rural areas or small villages under them.

Notes

Populated places in Morogoro Region
Wards of Morogoro Region